A stair is part of a flight of steps.

Stair may also refer to:

Places
Stair, Cumbria, England
Stair, East Ayrshire, Scotland

People
 Randy Stair (1992–2017), perpetrator of the Eaton Township Weis Markets shooting
 Sir Stair Agnew, (1831–1916), a Scottish public servant
 James Dalrymple, 1st Viscount of Stair (1619–1695), Scottish lawyer and politician
 John Dalrymple, 1st Earl of Stair (1648–1707), son of the previous
 John Dalrymple, 2nd Earl of Stair (1673–1747), son of the previous

Other uses
 The Stair Society, a learned society for the study of Scots Law, named for Viscount Stair

See also
 Stairs (disambiguation)
 House of Stairs (disambiguation)
 Staircase (disambiguation)
 Stairway (disambiguation)
 Step (disambiguation)